Spinturnix is a genus of mites in the family Spinturnicidae. Spinturnix mites are an ectoparasite found on species of bats. They live exclusively on the wing and tail membranes and are large enough to be seen with the naked eye. Spinturnix mites are a host specific species, meaning they have a few major host species that they prefer, as well as a few less frequently used hosts. In short, these mites will not infect arbitrary bat species. Their selection of host tends to align with the host species that lives closest to their local environment. Spinturnix mites are found strictly on Microchiroptera. These mites are hematophagous, meaning they feed on the blood of their host. They cannot survive without a host for more than a few hours. Therefore, transmission of mites to other hosts must occur by close contact, such as a bat in a roost.

Spinturnix mites are crab-like in appearance. Males have a shield-shaped plate on their underside and a pointed abdomen, while females have teardrop shaped shields and a rounded abdomen. The adaptive claws of the mite allows it to grip the wing membrane and efficiently keep hold of their host, even when their host is in flight.

Life cycle
Spinturnix reproduce sexually, but have been shown to align their reproductive cycle on that of its host, specifically by infesting newborns, which are a vulnerable host.

In Spinturnix mites, the egg and larva are embryonated and thus an active protonymph is born. The deuteronymph, which is the second stage of the life cycle, actively parasitizes and is similar to an adult mite in size and appearance. It has been demonstrated that Spinturnix mites end their reproduction and metamorphosis in winter, when their host species go into hibernation cycles. The life cycle of these mites is extremely shortened, which contributes to the instinct to preserve the offspring. Spinturnix mites spend their entire life cycle on the host species.

Distribution
Spinturnix mites can be found globally. They have been seen on bat species from North America to Asia to Europe to Africa.

Host preference
Studies have shown that Spinturnix mites are more prevalent on female hosts than male hosts. There is a higher survival rate for the mites when on a female host. However, Spinturnix mites also show preference towards subadult male hosts. Young host bats that are still dependent on their mother also show a high infestation rate. These preferences demonstrate the Spinturnix mite's ability to detect the host that they find to be the most beneficial to their survival.

Clinical significance
Spinturnix mites have a strong influence on the health and fitness of their host species of bats. These mites have the strongest impact during the maternity period of bat species. It has been demonstrated that pregnant or lactating bats have experienced increased oxygen consumption and weight loss due to Spinturnix infestations. Due to their hematophagous nature, these mites can cause anemia, lethargy, and loss of appetite in bats as well.

Species
These 51 species belong to the genus Spinturnix:

 Spinturnix abyssinica Hirst, 1927 - Africa
 Spinturnix acuminata (C. L. Koch, 1836) - Europe, Asia, North Africa
 Spinturnix aelleni Benoit, 1959 - Africa
 Spinturnix americana (Banks, 1902) - North, Central, and South America
 Spinturnix bakeri Rudnick, 1960 - North, Central, and South America
 Spinturnix banksi Rudnick, 1960 - Central United States
 Spinturnix bechsteini Deunff, Walter, Bellido & Volleth, 2004 - Europe, North Africa
 Spinturnix bregetovae Stanyukovich, 1996 - Mongolia, eastern Russian
 Spinturnix brevisetosa Gu & C. S. Wang, 1984 - China
 Spinturnix chiengmai Prasad, 1970 - Thailand
 Spinturnix dasycnemi (Kolenati, 1856) - Europe
 Spinturnix daubentonii (Kolenati, 1857) - Palearctic
 Spinturnix delacruzi Estrada-Peña, Ballesta & Ibañez, 1992 - Equatorial Guinea
 Spinturnix domrowi Deunff & Volleth, 1987 - Malaysia
 Spinturnix emarginata (Kolenati, 1856) - Palearctic
 Spinturnix eptesici Domrow, 1972 - Australia
 Spinturnix faini Benoit, 1959 - DR Congo
 Spinturnix globosa (Rudnick, 1960) - North and Central America
 Spinturnix intecta Dusbábek & Bergmans, 1980 - Nigeria
 Spinturnix kolenatii Oudemans, 1910 - Palearctic
 Spinturnix kolenatoides Ye & Ma, 1996 - China
 Spinturnix lawrencei Zumpt, 1951 - Africa
 Spinturnix loricata Domrow, 1972 - Australia
 Spinturnix maedai Uchikawa & Wada, 1979 - Japan
 Spinturnix mexicana Rudnick, 1960 - Mexico
 Spinturnix multisetosa Rudnick, 1960 - Madagascar
 Spinturnix myoti (Kolenati, 1856) - Europe, Asia, Middle East
 Spinturnix mystacina (Kolenati, 1857) - Palearctic
 Spinturnix nobleti Deunff, Volleth, Keller & Aellen, 1990 - Palearctic
 Spinturnix novaehollandiae Hirst, 1931 - Australia
 Spinturnix nudata Allred, 1969 - Pakistan
 Spinturnix orri Rudnick, 1960 - Mexico, United States
 Spinturnix paracuminata Baker & Delfinado, 1964 - Papua New Guinea
 Spinturnix pindarensis Bhat, 1973 - India
 Spinturnix plecotina (C. L. Koch, 1839) - Europe, Asia, North Africa
 Spinturnix psi (Kolenati, 1856) - Europa, Asia, Africa, Australia, Oceania, 
 Spinturnix punctata (Sundevall, 1833) - Palearctic
 Spinturnix rudnicki Advani & Vazirani, 1981 - India
 Spinturnix scotophili Zumpt & Till, 1954 - Africa
 Spinturnix scuticornis Dusbábek, 1970 - Afghanistan, Taiwan
 Spinturnix semilunaris DeMeillon & Lavoipierre, 1944 - Africa, Middle East
 Spinturnix setosus Pan & Teng, 1973 - China
 Spinturnix sinica Gu & C. S. Wang, 1984 - China
 Spinturnix subacuminata Furman, 1966 - Neotropics
 Spinturnix surinamensis Dusbábek & Lukoschus, 1971 - Neotropics
 Spinturnix tibetensis Teng, 1981 - Tibet, Philippines
 Spinturnix traubi Morales-Malacara & López, 1998 - Mexico
 Spinturnix tylonycterisi Deunff & Volleth, 1989 - Malaysia
 Spinturnix uchikawai Orlova, Zhigalin & Zhigalina, 2015 Russia (Kuril Islands)
 Spinturnix walkerae Zumpt & Till, 1954 - Africa
 Spinturnix wilsoni Prasad, 1969 - Papua New Guinea

References

Mesostigmata
Acari genera
Taxa named by Carl von Heyden